Coda Media is a New York-based news website, headed by Natalia Antelava, a former BBC correspondent, and Ilan Greenberg, a magazine and newspaper writer who served as a staff reporter for The Wall Street Journal. Peter Pomerantsev, a British journalist and TV producer, serves as the editor-at-large.

Concept 
Coda deploys a team of journalists to report on an ongoing crisis. Unlike traditional media outlets, Coda's journalists stay focused on a specific story for up to a year in order to put "individual stories in the context of larger events." Coda has covered three crises thus far; the migrant crisis in Europe, LGBT rights in Russia, and disinformation campaigns across Eurasia. The start-up employs a team of reporters, editors, and designers in the United States, Georgia, and Russia. Coda is attempting to bring together reporters from different news outlets to work on and develop stories together. Coda's reporting is accessible on the Coda Story website.

Coda is focused on "original storytelling." Coda divides its different reporting focuses into "currents," such as a disinformation current. The start-up plans to eventually have different "Codas" for different crises.

Funding 
Coda Media is a non-profit organization and depends on large foundation grants for the majority of its revenue. Coda Media has partnered with several newsrooms throughout Eurasia via the Coda Network, which received a grant of $180,130 from the US Government-backed National Endowment for Democracy.

Coda is a 501(c)(3) organization with offices in New York City and Tbilisi, Republic of Georgia. Coda is supported by foundation grants and private donations and has also experimented with crowd-funding.

Awards 
In 2018, Coda Story and Reveal won the Alfred I. duPont-Columbia University Award for their collaborative radio documentary "Russia's New Scapegoats", which explores the human costs as well as the political reasons behind the Kremlin's war on gay people.

In 2014, Coda won the Best Startups for News competition from the Global Editors Network. Coda was a finalist for the 2016 Excellence and Innovation in Visual Digital Storytelling for a Small Newsroom Award for its project, "Permission to Exterminate: Terror in Central Asia."

Partners 

 The Guardian
 EurasiaNet
 Magnum Photos
 Reveal from the Center for Investigative Reporting
 World Policy Institute
 Spektr.press
 Ukrayinska Pravda
 Hetq Online
 blog The Interpreter

References 

American journalism organizations
American news websites